Cule is a surname. Notable people with the surname include:

 John Cule (1920–2015), Welsh physician and psychiatrist
 W. E. Cule (1870–1944), British author